The Mann Egerton Type B was a 1910s British maritime patrol aircraft developed from the Short Type 184 by Mann Egerton and Company of Norwich.

Design and development
Mann Egerton were given a contract in 1915 to build the Short Type 184, a two-seat reconnaissance, bombing and torpedo carrying seaplane. As a result of experience gained with the Short 184 contract the company developed an improved version. The most noticeable difference was an increase of span of the upper wing.

Operational history
The Royal Naval Air Service operated all fifteen Type Bs on patrol duties.

Operator

Royal Naval Air Service

Specifications

References

See also

Type B
1910s British patrol aircraft
Single-engined tractor aircraft
Biplanes
Floatplanes
Aircraft first flown in 1916